Come Live with Me may refer to:

 Come Live with Me (film), a 1941 American romantic comedy film
 "Come Live with Me" (Heaven 17 song), 1983
 "Come Live with Me" (Roy Clark song), 1973

See also 
 "The Passionate Shepherd to His Love", a 16th-century poem by Christopher Marlowe that begins with these words